Thomas Chatterton (1752–1770) was an English poet and forger of pseudo-medieval poetry.

Chatterton may also refer to:

Places
 Chatterton, Indiana (extinct)
 Chatterton, Lancashire

Other uses
 Chatterton (horse), a racehorse
 Chatterton (surname)
 Chatterton (de Vigny), an 1835 drama by Alfred de Vigny
 Chatterton (opera), an 1876 opera by Ruggiero Leoncavallo
 "Chatterton," a song released in 1967 by French singer, songwriter, actor and director Serge Gainsbourg
 Chatterton (album), a 1994 album by French singer Alain Bashung
 Chatterton (Ackroyd), a 1987 book by Peter Ackroyd

See also
 Chatterton's compound, an early material for waterproofing submarine cables
 Chatterton House, the former Lamb Hotel, Nantwich, Cheshire
 T. C. Hammond (Thomas Chatterton Hammond, 1877–1961), Irish Anglican cleric
 Thomas Chatterton Williams (born 1981), American cultural critic and author
 Chatterton Village an area of the London Borough of Bromley, in southeast London, England, near Bromley Common and Southborough